This is a list of settlements in Illyria founded by Illyrians (southern Illyrians, Dardanians, Pannonians), Liburni, Ancient Greeks and the Roman Empire. A number of cities in Illyria and later Illyricum were built on the sites or close to the sites of pre-existing Illyrian settlements, though that was not always the case. Some settlements may have a double entry, for example the Ancient Greek Pola, Roman Pietas Julia, and some toponyms are reconstructed.

Albania

Identified sites

Unidentified sites

Bosnia and Herzegovina

Identified sites

Unidentified sites

Croatia

Identified sites

Unidentified sites

Kosovo

Identified sites

Unidentified sites

Montenegro

Identified sites

Unidentified sites

North Macedonia

Identified sites

Unidentified sites

Serbia

Identified sites

Unidentified sites

Illyrian settlements
 Epicaria of the Cavii
 Eugenium village or fort of the Partheni

Liburnian cities

 Gissa or Cissa – modern Caska near Novalja
 Pasinium – unknown position in Ražanac – Vinjerac – Posedarje range
 Sidrona of the Sidrini
 Scardona
 Tarsatica – Rijeka
 Ortoplinia or Ortopula – Stinica in Municipality of Senj
 Vegia or Vegium

Venetic cities
 Iramene
 Pellaon
 Palsatium
 Atina, Istria
 Caelina
 Volcera

Roman cities

 Gabuleus
 Crevenia
 Corragum fortress
 Clodiana
 Marusium

A very small part of the Roman province of Italia included Istria.
 Aruccia
 Arauzona
 Arba, Scardona
 Aleta, Dalmatia
 Berginium
 Ausancali
 Jader
 Herona
 Senia, Liburnia
 Adra, Liburnia
 Sicum
 Blanona, Liburnia
 Siparuntum
 Ouporum
 Iminacium
 Stulpi
 Ardotium mentioned by Pliny and Ptolemy to be at inland Liburnia
 Collentum
 Tediastum inland Liburnia, along river Tedanius
 Curcum
 Vicianum
 Velanis

Mislocated
 Thermidava, placed by Ptolemy on the Lissus-Naissus route. The toponym is most probably a misreading of a settlement which most scholars in contemporary research locate near present-day Banat, Serbia. 
 Quemedava mentioned by Procopius in Dardania.

See also 
 List of ancient tribes in Illyria
 List of ancient cities in Thrace and Dacia
 Ancient geographic names in Croatia

Notes

References

Bibliography

External links 

Settlements
Illyria
Former populated places in the Balkans